Azinphos-ethyl (also spelled azinophos-ethyl) was a broad-spectrum organophosphate insecticide.

Regulation
It is very toxic to mammals with a World Health Organization hazard classification as class IB, highly hazardous. It is classified as an extremely hazardous substance in the United States as defined in Section 302 of the U.S. Emergency Planning and Community Right-to-Know Act (42 U.S.C. 11002), and is subject to strict reporting requirements by facilities which produce, store, or use it in significant quantities.

See also
 Azinphos-methyl

References

Obsolete pesticides
Acetylcholinesterase inhibitors
Organophosphate insecticides
Phosphorodithioates